The Ivorian Basketball Championship is the premier basketball league for clubs in Ivory Coast. The league consist out of eleven teams. The most notable team in the league's history is ABC Fighters, who won 20 titles.

The champions of the national championship are eligible to play in the qualifying rounds of the Basketball Africa League (BAL).

Current teams 
The following were the eleven teams for the 2019 season:
ABC Fighters
Abidjan Azur
SOA
CSA Treichville
Ivestp
Warriors
ASA
Africa Sports National
GSPM
JCA Abidjan
Sewe

Champions

Individual awards
Final MVP
2021: Asshe Kokoun (SOA)
Regular Season MVP:
2020: Stéphane Konaté (ABC Fighters)
2021: Lionel Kouadio (Azur)

References

External links
Ivory Coast at AfroBasket.com

Basketball in Ivory Coast
Basketball leagues in Africa
Sports leagues in Ivory Coast